Christopher Michael Mann (born May 5, 1982) is an American singer-songwriter and actor from Wichita, Kansas.

He came in fourth on the second season of NBC's television singing competition The Voice in 2012. Mann came in first on Team Christina Aguilera and represented her in the final round. His album, Constellation, was released on May 6, 2016.

Music career

Early life
After graduating in 2000 from Wichita Southeast High School in Wichita, Kansas, Mann attended Vanderbilt University. He graduated from Vanderbilt's Blair School of Music in 2004 with a degree in vocal performance. Mann was a member of the Sigma Nu Fraternity where his pledge name was Buttercup.

After graduation, Mann was cast in an Italian opera in Europe. After moving to Los Angeles, he obtained numerous studio and group singing gigs, including Dalton Academy "Warbler #6" on an episode of Glee, the Sundance Film Festival, and the AFI Life Achievement Award 2010.

His studio work has been featured in the film Avatar, Glee: The 3D Concert Movie, Letters to Juliet, Tangled, Sex and the City 2, The Smurfs, 2012 and The Philanthropist. His recording of "L.O.V.E." was featured in a commercial for season two of Khloé & Lamar, and he has recorded music with Heather Headley, performed with Katharine McPhee, and toured with India Arie and Idina Menzel.

The Voice
Mann participated in the second season of the singing reality show The Voice, ultimately placing fourth. He was initially chosen by judges Christina Aguilera and Cee Lo Green after singing Andrea Bocelli's "Because We Believe (Ama Credi E Vai)". He chose to be part of Team Christina Aguilera, on whose team he had hoped to be selected from the start.

He advanced to the live shows by defeating Monique Benabou in a duet of "The Power of Love". In his first live show, he performed "Bridge over Troubled Water" by Simon & Garfunkel, which earned him a pass to the next round by public vote. During the quarter-finals, he covered "Viva la Vida" by Coldplay, and was again selected for advancement to the semi-finals by public vote. He advanced to the finals, edging out Lindsey Pavao, after singing "Ave Maria".

For the finale, he soloed "You Raise Me Up", sang "The Prayer" in a duet with Aguilera, and covered Aguilera's "The Voice Within". During the final results show, Mann performed "Bitter Sweet Symphony" by The Verve for his final performance with previously eliminated semi-finalists Pavao and Katrina Parker. Mann consistently received praise from the other coaches; Cee Lo Green called Mann's voice "incomparable", while Blake Shelton called Mann a "powerhouse" and a "really strong singer".

Performances and results

Debut album
Mann was planning on releasing a Christmas EP before releasing his full-length studio album. The EP was released three weeks before the October 30, 2012, release of his debut studio album, Roads. While the EP was a Walmart exclusive, the album's songs were later released as singles in iTunes.

PBS specials
Shortly after the release of his album and Christmas EP, Mann recorded a PBS concert special titled "Chris Mann in Concert: A Mann for all Seasons". The special premiered on WTVS on December 14 and became available for purchase on DVD and CD shortly after that. The special aired nationwide in March 2013.

While preparing for the second leg of the tour to promote Roads, Mann announced he had also recorded a Christmas special for PBS. The special, titled Home for Christmas: The Chris Mann Christmas Special, premiered on WTVS on August 17, 2013.

The Phantom of the Opera
Mann toured for two years with the North American tour of The Phantom of the Opera, in which he played the lead role of the Phantom. The 2015/2016 tour kicked off on May 27, 2015 at the ASU Gammage Theatre in Tempe, Arizona, USA.

The Voice: Neon Dreams
In 2017, Mann was announced as one of several vocalists from the talent show The Voice to be part of a Las Vegas live concert series titled The Voice: Neon Dreams. It was to also feature season ten winner Alisan Porter, Mary Sarah (season 10), Matthew Schuler (season 5), and Matt McAndrew (season 7), and to be backed by a band led by Michael Sanchez. It was announced in October 2018 that the show would not go ahead.

COVID-19 parodies
In 2020, Mann produced several COVID-19-themed musical parodies on YouTube. Several went viral, including parodies of "Hello", originally by Adele, and "Old Town Road".

Personal life
Mann married his longtime girlfriend, Laura Perloe, in 2013 at Maravilla Gardens in Camarillo, Ventura County in Southern California.

In May 2017, the couple announced they were expecting their first child, a son named Hugo, who was born later that year.

In October 2020, the couple announced that they were expecting their second child, due in January 2021. On January 11, 2021, Mann and his wife welcomed their second child together, a boy named Rocky.

Discography

Studio albums

Live albums

Extended plays

Singles

As lead artist

As featured artist

Other charted songs

Note

See also

 List of singer-songwriters
 List of people from Los Angeles
 List of people from Wichita, Kansas
 List of Vanderbilt University people

References

External links

 
 

1982 births
21st-century American singers
21st-century American male singers
American male singer-songwriters
American tenors
Living people
Musicians from Wichita, Kansas
Singer-songwriters from California
The Voice (franchise) contestants
Vanderbilt University alumni
Wichita Southeast High School alumni
Writers from Wichita, Kansas
Singer-songwriters from Kansas